In knot theory, a branch of mathematics, a twist knot is a knot obtained by repeatedly twisting a closed loop and then linking the ends together.  (That is, a twist knot is any Whitehead double of an unknot.)  The twist knots are an infinite family of knots, and are considered the simplest type of knots after the torus knots.

Construction
A twist knot is obtained by linking together the two ends of a twisted loop.  Any number of half-twists may be introduced into the loop before linking, resulting in an infinite family of possibilities.  The following figures show the first few twist knots:

Properties

All twist knots have unknotting number one, since the knot can be untied by unlinking the two ends.  Every twist knot is also a 2-bridge knot.  Of the twist knots, only the unknot and the stevedore knot are slice knots.  A twist knot with  half-twists has crossing number .  All twist knots are invertible, but the only amphichiral twist knots are the unknot and the figure-eight knot.

Invariants
The invariants of a twist knot depend on the number  of half-twists.   The Alexander polynomial of a twist knot is given by the formula

and the Conway polynomial is

When  is odd, the Jones polynomial is

and when  is even, it is

References

Twist knots
Double torus knots and links